The 26th Maneuver Enhancement Brigade ("Yankee") is a combat support brigade of the United States Army. Its headquarters is maintained by the Massachusetts Army National Guard. It draws its lineage from the Headquarters Company 26th Infantry Division.

However, most of the history of the current 26th MEB stems from the 26th Infantry Division. The 26th Division served in World Wars I and II and was recreated in the Massachusetts Army National Guard after being released from active duty on 13 November 1946.

History
Constituted 18 July 1917 in the National Guard as Headquarters, 26th Division (to be organized with troops from Connecticut, Maine, Massachusetts, New Hampshire, Rhode Island, and Vermont)
1 March 1963: Redesignated as 1st Brigade, 26th Infantry Division, Headquartered at Waltham, Massachusetts.
1 September 1993: Reorganized as 26th Infantry Brigade, 29th Infantry Division
2005: Reorganized into the 26th Brigade Combat Team, 42nd Infantry Division
2008: Reorganized as 26th Maneuver Enhancement Brigade (MEB), a combat support brigade, Camp Curtis Guild, MA
2016: Relocated to Private First Class Michael J. Perkins Readiness Center, Natick, MA

 Units 
The Brigade consists of a Headquarters and Headquarters Company, 126th Brigade Support Battalion and the 26th Signal Company'''.

Campaign Participation Credit 

 World War I
 Champagne-Marne
 Aisne-Marne
 St. Mihiel
 Meuse-Argonne
 Ile de France 1918
 Lorraine 1918
 World War II
 Northern France
 Rhineland
 Ardennes-Alsace
 Central Europe
 War on Terrorism (Campaigns to be determined)

Decorations 

 Cited in the Order of the Day of the Belgian Army for action in the Ardennes
 Headquarters Company (Natick) additionally entitled to:
 French Croix de Guerre with Gilt Star, World War I, Streamer embroidered LORRAINE
 French Croix de Guerre with Palm, World War II, Streamer embroidered LORRAINE
 French Croix de Guerre, World War II, Fourragere

See also
 Reorganization plan of United States Army

References

External links
The unit's official lineage and honors can be found here

Maneuver 026
Military units and formations established in 2008
Military units and formations in Massachusetts
Military units and formations in Maine
Military units and formations in New Hampshire
Military units and formations in Vermont
Military units and formations in Rhode Island
026

sl:26. pehotna divizija (ZDA)